The Enzo Bearzot Award is a recognition given to Italian football managers annually. Established in 2011 and awarded by a jury composed of representatives of major Italian sports newspapers, the prize is sponsored by the Sporting Union of the Christian Associations of Italian Workers and the Italian Football Federation.

History
The award was created in honour of the 1982 FIFA World Cup winning coach Enzo Bearzot of the Italy national team. He holds the record for most appearances on the bench of the Italy national team at 104 times from 27 September 1975 to 18 June 1986. He died on 21 December 2010 in Milan at the age of 83, exactly 42 years after Vittorio Pozzo.

The Enzo Bearzot Award is given each year by the president of the Italian Football Federation, at the hall of honor of the Italian National Olympic Committee.

Winners

Notes

References

Awards established in 2011
2011 establishments in Italy
Italy
Italian football trophies and awards